Martina Hingis and Leander Paes defeated Sania Mirza and Ivan Dodig in the final, 4–6, 6–4, [10–8] to win the mixed doubles tennis title at the 2016 French Open. Hingis and Paes each completed the individual career Grand Slam with the win, as well as the team career Grand Slam. Paes also tied Martina Navratilova's record for the most major mixed doubles titles (10) in the Open Era.

Bethanie Mattek-Sands and Mike Bryan were the reigning champions, but did not participate this year.

Seeds

Draw

Finals

Top half

Bottom half

References

External links
 Draw
2016 French Open – Doubles draws and results at the International Tennis Federation

Mixed Doubles
2016 ATP World Tour
2016 WTA Tour
2016